Karadach or Kuridach (in Greek Κουριδαχος, Kouridachos) was an important chieftain of the Akatziri tribe of the Hunnic confederation during the reign of Attila. According to Priscus he rose to prominence when he was courted by Roman diplomats in 448 AD as a potential ally against the Huns, but used the information to help his overlord foil a revolt among lesser chiefs of the Akatziri; thus Attila left his lands untouched while the remaining were taken.

Etymology
Otto J. Maenchen-Helfen considers the name to be "possibly" Turkic. He suggests an etymology of *Qurtaq: qurt (wolf) plus the diminutive suffix -q.

References

Books 
 

5th-century monarchs in Europe
Huns
Attila the Hun